Duncum is a surname. Notable people with the surname include: 

Bobby Duncum Jr. (1965–2000), American wrestler
Bobby Duncum Sr. (born 1944), American wrestler, father of Bobby Duncum Jr.
Ken Duncum, New Zealand playwright and screenwriter
Sam Duncum (born 1987), English footballer